White Alder may refer to:

 USCGC White Alder (WLM-541), a United States Coast Guard ship
 Alnus incana, a European flowering plant
 Alnus rhombifolia, a North American flowering plant